Acteonemertidae is a family of worms belonging to the order Monostilifera. It contains 5 genera which are terrestrial and can be found on the Iberian Peninsula. 

Genera:
 Acteonemertes Pantin, 1961
 Antiponemertes Moore & Gibson, 1981
 Argonemertes Moore & Gibson, 1981
 Katechonemertes Moore & Gibson, 1981
 Leptonemertes Girard, 1893

References

Monostilifera